Lafayette High School is the name of many secondary schools in the United States, among them:

Lafayette High School (Alabama), in Lafayette, Alabama
Lafayette High School (Georgia), in Lafayette, Georgia
Lafayette High School (Florida), in Mayo, Florida
Lafayette High School (Kentucky), in Lexington, Kentucky
Lafayette High School (Louisiana), in Lafayette, Louisiana
Lafayette High School (St. Joseph, Missouri), in St. Joseph, Missouri
Lafayette High School (Wildwood, Missouri), in Wildwood, Missouri
Lafayette High School (Buffalo, New York), in Buffalo, New York
Lafayette High School (New York City, New York), in Brooklyn, New York
Lafayette High School (Virginia), near Williamsburg, Virginia
LaFayette Jr./Sr. High School (LaFayette, New York), in LaFayette, New York
Lafayette High School (Mississippi), in Oxford, Mississippi